Jack McKinney may refer to:

Jack McKinney (writer), pseudonym used by American authors James Luceno and Brian Daley
Jack McKinney (basketball) (1935-2018), American basketball coach

See also
John McKinney (disambiguation)
Jack McKenzie (disambiguation)
Jack Kinney (1909–1992), American animator